Liberal Party, was a political party in Peru. It was founded in 1901 by Augusto Durand Maldonado.

Liberal parties in Peru
Political parties established in 1901